Hit Maker!: Burt Bacharach Plays the Burt Bacharach Hits is the debut album by American composer Burt Bacharach. The album was recorded in London, with uncredited vocals by the Breakaways, and the musicians included Jimmy Page, John Paul Jones, Big Jim Sullivan, and members of the Ted Heath band.

Originally issued by Kapp Records in 1965, it was reissued in 1968 as Burt Bacharach Plays His Hits.  After Kapp Records was consolidated with its co-owned labels into MCA Records, it was reissued on the MCA label in 1973.

Track listing
All tracks composed by Burt Bacharach and Hal David.

Side A
 "Don't Make Me Over" – 2:57
 "Walk On By" – 2:52
 "Don't Go Breaking My Heart" – 2:26
 "Blue On Blue" – 2:01
 "The Last One to Be Loved" – 3:27
 "(There's) Always Something There to Remind Me" – 2:58

Side B
 "Twenty Four Hours from Tulsa" – 2:34
 "Trains and Boats and Planes" – 2:43
 "Wives and Lovers" – 2:50
 "Saturday Sunshine" – 2:10
 "A House Is Not a Home" – 3:31
 "Anyone Who Had a Heart" – 3:30

References 

1965 debut albums
MCA Records albums
Burt Bacharach albums
Albums produced by Burt Bacharach